Captain Norman Cyril Jones (8 February 1895 – 23 March 1974) was an English flying ace during World War I. He was credited with nine aerial victories.

Early life
Norman Cyril Jones was born in Cheshire, England. His birth date is unknown; however, he would have to have been born prior to 1897 to be old enough to be commissioned into the military at the start of World War I in 1914.

World War I
Jones was commissioned as a second lieutenant in the 2nd East Lancashire Brigade on 14 September 1914. He was promoted to lieutenant in the Royal Horse and Field Artillery on 1 June 1916.

On 8 June 1917, second lieutenant Jones was appointed a flying officer in the Royal Flying Corps; this appointment customarily marked graduation from pilot's training. From 21 June to 19 August 1917 he was posted to No. 71 Squadron while it was in Warwickshire. In late 1917, he was assigned to No. 28 Squadron in Italy. He scored his first aerial victory while with them, on 25 January 1918.

On 30 January 1918 Jones was appointed a flight commander with the temporary rank of captain. He subsequently transferred in theatre, to No. 45 Squadron, where he resumed his winning ways on 19 May 1918. He would run his score to nine by 21 August 1918.

He earned a Distinguished Flying Cross for his courageous service. It was gazetted on 21 September 1918:

Needless to say, the award citation was based on incomplete information, as Jones' victory list shows.

List of aerial victories

Between the World Wars
On 23 January 1919, Jones was placed on the RAF's unemployed list. His assignment to the RAF was ended and he was returned to the Royal Horse and Royal Field Artillery of the Territorial Force. He gave up his commission on 30 September 1921.

As Jones left the military, he moved into the business world. He was involved in the reorganization of the family business in March 1920, which established John Jones as chairman.

World War II and beyond
He rejoined the RAF for World War II; on 23 February 1941 he was commissioned as an acting probationary pilot officer for "the duration of hostilities...."

References

Bibliography

1895 births
1974 deaths
Military personnel from Cheshire
People from Cheshire (before 1974)
Royal Flying Corps officers
Royal Air Force personnel of World War I
British World War I flying aces
Recipients of the Distinguished Flying Cross (United Kingdom)
Royal Air Force personnel of World War II
Royal Air Force officers
British Army personnel of World War I
Royal Field Artillery officers